The Princess of Wales Bridge, sometimes referred to as the Diana Bridge or the Princess Diana Bridge, is a dual carriageway road bridge named after the late Diana, Princess of Wales. It carries Council of Europe Boulevard across the River Tees, Northern England.

Teesdale Business Park in Thornaby is to the south and to the north is the north east of Stockton town centre (at the north end of Riverside Road at a gyratory system). It is in the borough of Stockton-on-Tees.

Design 

The bridge is of a slab and girder design with concrete piers and steel plate girder decking.
The bridge has three spans – the centre span is 40 metres with two side spans of 30 metres each.
The bridge has four steel plate girders with composite concrete decking and the abutments and piers are supported on steel H piles driven to sandstone bedrock.

Construction 

The bridge was commissioned by the Teesside Development Corporation
and built at a cost of £3 million by Tarmac Group.

Operation 

The bridge was inaugurated on 23 September 1992
by Diana, Princess of Wales.
On rare occasions the bridge is closed for fireworks events.

After the death of Diana, Princess of Wales the bridge was fitted with two memorial plaques.

Local facilities 

Just downriver of the bridge is the River Tees Watersports Centre hosting watersports such as rowing, canoeing, waterskiing, jet skiing and dragon boat racing.

Image gallery

References

External links 

 Princess of Wales Bridge on Bridges on the Tyne website
 
 The River Tees Watersports Centre.

Crossings of the River Tees
Bridges completed in 1992
Bridges in County Durham
Bridges in North Yorkshire
Buildings and structures in Stockton-on-Tees
Thornaby-on-Tees